Henry Francis Korth is a professor of Computer Science and Engineering and co-director of the Computer Science and Business program at Lehigh University.

Early life and education 
Korth holds an A.B degree in mathematics from Williams College in Williamstown, Massachusetts. Later he studied at Princeton University and graduated in 1979 for M.A. and M.S.E. degrees. After that he completed his Ph.D. from Princeton University in 1981. His dissertation title was "Locking Protocols: General Lock Classes and Deadlock Freedom".

Books 
The Mobile Computing Book was published in 1996.
Database System Concepts, published in 2011, was co-authored with Avi Silberschatz and S. Sudarshan. This book is widely used for academic purposes and university curriculum. 

His work has been cited over 16,000 times.

Career 
Korth served on the faculty of the Department of Computer Sciences at the University of Texas at Austin, where he held the rank of associate professor with tenure from 1983 to 1992.

Later, he held positions of leadership with Lucent Technology's Bell Laboratories in Murray Hill, N.J. As Director of Database Principles Research.

He was Professor of Computer Science and Engineering at Lehigh University from 2003 to 2009.

The Blockchain Lab is currently led by Korth.

References

External links 

 ACM
 IEEE Fellow

University of Texas at Austin faculty
Scientists at Bell Labs
Lehigh University faculty
Princeton University alumni
Williams College alumni
Living people
Year of birth missing (living people)
American computer scientists
Fellow Members of the IEEE
Fellows of the Association for Computing Machinery